Thaub may refer to:
 Thawb, a traditional Arab garment
 Thaub, Yemen